Tony Roper (born 19 August 1941) is a Scottish actor, comedian, playwright and writer.

Career
In his early life he worked as a miner in Fife (where there were family connections), and as a van boy in a Glasgow bakery. His first major starring role was in Scotch and Wry. He wrote the comedy-drama The Steamie in 1987, for which he won a BAFTA. He achieved even greater fame in Naked Video and in the spin-off series Rab C. Nesbitt, in which he played Rab's partner-in-crime, Jamesie Cotter. He also starred in the short-lived 1999 sitcom All Along the Watchtower. Tony also had a small part as the postman in the longer version of the 1973 cult film, The Wicker Man.

In theatre, he played Tom Weals in Miles Tredinnick's farce It's Now or Never! at the Queen's Theatre, Hornchurch in 1994. Also starred other stage plays such as Willie Rough by Bill Bryden, "The Red Runner" by Billy Connolly, and various other plays by Alyn Aykbourn, Shaw and Shakespeare.

In the 1980s, he co-founded the charity football team Dukla Pumpherston. Other football-related work included regular appearances on the television and stage versions of the satirical series Only an Excuse? during the 1990s alongside Jonathan Watson.

Roper has also written Paddies, a conceptual sequel to The Steamie set in Glasgow's "Paddies Market" (Paddy's Market), and two novels based on Rikki Fulton's character Rev. I. M. Jolly. In 2004-2005 he co-wrote and starred as Rikki Fulton in Rikki and Me, a play about the comedy actor Rikki Fulton, which is available on DVD, and appeared as Merv in the 2005 Scottish film, On a Clear Day.

Other activities
Roper is a lifelong supporter of Celtic F.C. He presented the club' s VHS/DVD The Treble in celebration of Celtic's 2000–01 treble-winning season, and Hoops we did it again in 2001–2002. In 2008, he wrote and directed the hit play The Celts in Seville which played at the Pavilion Theatre (Glasgow) in 2008 and 2014.

Personal life
Roper and his wife Isobel live in Glasgow.

He was awarded an honorary degree by Abertay University in 2008.

In April 2013, Roper received treatment for prostate cancer. He was given the all-clear.

His autobiography I'll No Tell You Again was published in 2014. The foreword was written by his friend, Billy Connolly.

Filmography

References

External links 

1941 births
Living people
Scottish male stage actors
Scottish male television actors
Scottish dramatists and playwrights
People educated at St Mungo's Academy
People from Anderston
Comedians from Glasgow
Scottish people of Irish descent